Feyzin is a commune in the Metropolis of Lyon in Auvergne-Rhône-Alpes region in eastern France.

History 

The refinery near Feyzin was the location of an explosion and fire on January 4, 1966 which resulted in the deaths of 18 people and the injury of 81.

Population

Transports
There are many Bus Lines and the tramway line for direction Vénissieux station and 8th arrondissement.

References

Communes of Lyon Metropolis
Dauphiné